The London Underground 1972 Stock is a type of rolling stock used on the London Underground. The 1972 Stock was originally ordered to make up the shortfall in trains on the Northern line's 1959 Tube Stock fleet, but is currently used on the Bakerloo line. Following the withdrawal of the British Rail Class 483 EMUs in 2021, the 1972 Stock are now the oldest EMUs in passenger service in the United Kingdom. A total of 63 seven-car trains were built in two separate batches.

Construction

A total of 252 cars were built by Metro-Cammell at Washwood Heath.

In the early 1970s, the 1938 Tube stock on the Bakerloo and Northern line was life-expired and due for replacement. Tentative designs for a new Northern line fleet were abandoned when the go-ahead was given for the Piccadilly line to be extended to Heathrow Airport. That required a totally new fleet of trains to replace the 1959 stock then in use. The plan was made to transfer the 1959 trains to the Northern, to allow the worst of the 1938 stock there to be scrapped, but there were only 76 1959 Tube stock trains, and the Northern line needed more than that to operate. Originally, it was planned to refurbish around 30 of the 1938 trains, but this was scrapped in favour of 30 new trains of the 1972 Mark 1 Tube stock.

The 1972 Tube stock was ordered in a hurry, so there was no time to create a new design; the trains were based on the 1967 Tube stock on the Victoria line. Although almost identical looking, the 1972 trains had a guard and door controls in the rear car, and were not compatible with 1967 Tube stock. In later years some surplus 1972 Mark 1 cars were adapted to run with the 1967 trains on the Victoria line, being formed in the middle due to the lack of ATO equipment.

A further 33 trains of 1972 Tube stock were ordered to provide service on the Northern line. The 1972 Mark 2 stock had slightly different interiors, such as dark blue seating moquette, unlike the red and grey on the earlier 1967 and 1972 cars. The biggest external difference was that the doors were painted red, with a London Transport roundel on the side of the carriages, rather than the Johnston lettering. Unlike the 1967 or 1972 Mark 1 trains, the train number was displayed on an LED on the driver's desk. In the old trains the number box was integrated into the driver's door. 

The 1972 Mark 2 trains first operated on the Northern line alongside the 1972 Mark 1 trains. In 1977, they were transferred to the Bakerloo line and operated alongside the 1938 Stock until the opening of the Jubilee line in 1979. In 1989, several Northern line units were painted in experimental liveries, and three trains were internally refurbished, before the refurbishment work was stopped because of the decision to order a new fleet. 3227 and 3518 were painted with blue doors and a white body, 3204 and 3522 were painted with a blue and white body, and 3202 and 3523 were painted in what would become a corporate livery.

With the introduction of the 1983 Tube stock on the Jubilee in 1984, half of the 1972 Mark 2 trains were transferred back to the Northern line. After the introduction of a second batch of 1983 Stock on the Jubilee in 1987, all 1972 Mark 2 trains on the Jubilee and Northern lines were transferred to the Bakerloo line, where they remain in service. The earlier (Mark 1) 1972 stock on the Northern line was replaced by 1995 Tube Stock in 1999. After being withdrawn from the Northern line, a few cars of 1972 Mark 1 stock were converted to run with 1967 stock in service on the Victoria line. 

A further two trains were converted to be compatible with the Mark II type, and these now run on the Bakerloo line. One ex-Northern line set (3229) was based at the now-closed Aldwych station, for use in films until being sent to Ealing Common Depot in November 2021 and then Ruislip Depot a month later. Another Mark 1 unit in a trial livery was sent to Acton Works to be used for shunting. One three-car unit (unit 3511) used to reside at Hainault depot until October 2018, where cars 4511 and 3411 had moved to Acton Works. The cab of unit 3511 had been used onto unit 3538 following collision damage.

The 1972 trains are formed of seven-car sets and have a total of 268 passenger seats. After withdrawal from the Northern Line, five four-car units (units 3201, 3208, 3211, 3212 and 3230) were considered for use on the Waterloo and City line. The objective was to supply the Central line with extra 1992 stock. This never happened and the trains were sent to Mayer Perry or CF Booth of Rotherham to be scrapped.

The fleet was refurbished between 1991 and 1995 by Tickford at Rosyth Dockyard. From 2016 to 2018, the fleet was again refurbished at Acton Works to enable the trains to remain in service until their forecast replacement date of 2035. The class received the Class 499/2 designation on British Rail's TOPS system to operate on the Bakerloo line north of Queens Park.

Roster

Future replacement
In the late 1990s, the Labour government initiated a public–private partnership (PPP) to reverse years of underinvestment in London Underground. Under the PPP contract, Metronet (the private consortium responsible for the Bakerloo line) would order new rolling stock for the Bakerloo line. This would take place following the delivery of 2009 Stock and S Stock trains, with an order for 24 new Bakerloo line trains. These would have entered service by 2019. However, Metronet collapsed in 2007 after cost overruns, and the PPP ended in 2010.

In the mid 2010s, TfL began a process of ordering new rolling stock to replace trains on the Piccadilly, Central, Bakerloo and Waterloo & City lines. A feasibility study showed that new-generation trains and resignalling could increase capacity on the Bakerloo line by 25%, with 27 trains per hour.

In June 2018, the Siemens Mobility Inspiro design was selected. These trains will have an open-gangway design, wider doorways, air conditioning and the ability to run automatically with a new signalling system. TfL could only afford to order Piccadilly line trains at a cost of £1.5bn. However, the contract with Siemens includes an option for 40 trains for the Bakerloo line in the future. This would take place after the delivery of the Piccadilly line trains in the late 2020s. Based on a November 2021 paper, due to a lack of funding, this might not happen until the late 2030s or early 2040s, when the trains would be 60 to 70 years old — probably double their design life. Since the withdrawal of the Class 483 on the Isle of Wight, the 1972-stock trains have become the oldest non-heritage trains running in the United Kingdom.

Post-withdrawal use

Asset Inspection Train

Middle two cars are 67DM vehicles - 3079, 3179. Front 2 and rear two are 72 Mark 1 stock
 Front two (72 Mark 1) 3313-4313
 Rear two (72 Mark 1) 4213-3213
Units 3079 & 3179 were overhauled at Eastleigh Works. With no cab windows and new cables leading into each other. The AIT (Asset Inspection Train) was to replace the Track Recording Train (1960 Stock DMs and 73 Stock T) which is currently in use. However, in July 2021 the AIT was scrapped at LKM Recycling Sittingbourne.

References

External links
 Transport for London - Rolling Stock - 1972
 Tubeprune - 1972 Tube Stock

1972
Metropolitan Cammell multiple units
Train-related introductions in 1972